The Lambeth Waterworks Company was a utility company supplying water to parts of south London in England. The company was established in 1785 with works in north Lambeth and became part of the publicly owned Metropolitan Water Board in 1904.

Origins

The Lambeth Waterworks Company, founded in 1785 to supply water to south and west London, established premises on the south bank of the River Thames close to the present site of Hungerford Bridge where the Royal Festival Hall now stands.  The Company's first water-intake lay on the south side of the river, supplied directly from the river. After complaints that the water was foul, the intake was moved to the middle of the river. The Company expanded to supply Kennington in 1802 and about this time replaced its wooden pipes with iron ones.

Infrastructure
In 1832 the company built a reservoir at Streatham Hill, and in 1834 obtained an Act of Parliament to extend its area of supply. In the same year the company purchased  of land in Brixton and built a reservoir and works on Brixton Hill adjacent to Brixton Prison.

Around the 1850s the quality of drinking water became a matter of public concern, and John Snow examined the state of waters in 1849. Parliament passed the Metropolis Water Act 1852 to "make provision for securing the supply to the Metropolis of pure and wholesome water". Under the Act, it became unlawful for any water company to extract water for domestic use from the tidal reaches of the Thames after 31 August 1855, and from 31 December 1855 all such water was required to be "effectually filtered". The directors had already decided in 1847 to move the intake for their reservoirs to Seething Wells. The facilities were completed in 1852, and the Lambeth was joined there taking advantage of its pipes to the city by the Chelsea Waterworks Company. The facilities played a role in John Snow's statistical investigations during a cholera outbreak, the facility was further upriver than many other waterworks and hence had cleaner water, leading to fewer cholera deaths.

However the inlets pumped in too much silt with the water because of turbulence caused by the discharge (confluence) of the River Mole/Ember and The Rythe into the Thames immediately upstream.  The Lambeth Waterworks Company thus moved upstream to Molesey between Sunbury and Molesey Locks, where they built the Molesey Reservoirs in 1872 and the Chelsea Waterworks Company followed them there three years later.

See also
London water supply infrastructure

References

London water infrastructure
British companies established in 1785
Former water company predecessors of Thames Water
1785 establishments in England
Water supply
Companies established in 1785